Nira Shpak (born 20 July 1966) is an Israeli soldier, civil servant and politician. She was a member of the Knesset for Yesh Atid from 2021 to 2022.

Biography
A member of the Kfar Aza kibbutz, Shpak was a career soldier. She was the first woman to reach the rank of brigade commander and commander of an operational sector, and was the first woman to lead the training section of the Israeli Ground Forces. After being discharged with the rank of brigadier general, she worked at the Ministry of Defense and Ministry of Home Front Defense.

Entering politics, she ran for head of the Sha'ar HaNegev Regional Council in the 2018 local elections. Prior to the 2021 Knesset elections she was placed seventeenth on the Yesh Atid list, and was elected to the Knesset as the party won seventeen seats. She did not contest the 2022 elections, choosing to return to local politics.

References

External links

1966 births
Living people
20th-century Israeli military personnel
21st-century Israeli civil servants
21st-century Israeli military personnel
21st-century Israeli women politicians
Bar-Ilan University alumni
Ben-Gurion University of the Negev alumni
Israeli colonels
Israeli Jews
Jewish Israeli politicians
Jewish military personnel
Kibbutzniks
Members of the 24th Knesset (2021–2022)
People from Rehovot
Women members of the Knesset
Yesh Atid politicians
Jewish women politicians